The common trees and shrubs of Sri Lanka are a part of the diverse plant wildlife of Sri Lanka.

The following list provides the 704 species of common trees and shrubs of flora of Sri Lanka under 95 families. The list is according to A Field Guide to the Common Trees and Shrubs of Sri Lanka, by Mark Ashton, Savitri Gunatilleke, Neela de Zoysa, M.D. Dassanayake, Nimal Gunatilleke and Siril Wijesundera.

Native species are denoted as (N), Introduced species as (I)

Division: Pteridophyta

Family: Cyatheaceae - Scaly tree ferns 

 Cyathea crinita - N
 Cyathea gigantea - N
 Cyathea hookeri - Endemic
 Cyathea sinuata - N
 Cyathea walkerae - N

Division: Cycadophyta

Family: Cycadaceae - Queen Sago 

 Cycas circinalis - N

Division: Pinophyta

Family: Araucariaceae - Araucarians

 Agathis robusta - I
 Araucaria bidwillii - I
 Araucaria cookii - I
 Araucaria cunninghamii - I

Family: Cupressaceae - Cypresses
 Cupressus macrocarpa - I
 Cupressus torulosa - I

Family: Pinaceae - Pines
 Pinus caribaea - I 
 Pinus patula - I

Division: Anthophyta

Subdivision: Monocotyledons

Family: Asparagaceae 
 Dracaena fragrans - I
 Dracaena reflexa - I

Family: Poaceae‡ - Grasses
 Bambusa bambos - N
 Bambusa multiplex - I
 Bambusa polymorpha - N
 Bambusa vulgaris - I
 Davidsea attenuata - Endemic
 Dendrocalamus giganteus - I
 Dendrocalamus asper - I
 Dendrocalamus hamiltonii - I
 Dendrocalamus longispathus - I
 Dendrocalamus strictus - I
 Melocanna baccifera - I
 Neololeba atra - I
 Ochlandra stridula - Endemic
 Pseudoxytenanthera monadelpha - N

Family: Musaceae - Bananas
 Musa balbisiana - N

Family: Strelitziaceae - Traveller's palm
 Ravenala madagascariensis - I

Family: Arecaceae - Palm trees 
 Areca catechu - I
 Borassus flabellifer - I
 Caryota urens - N
 Cocos nucifera - I
 Corypha umbraculifera - N
 Oncosperma fasciculatum - Endemic
 Phoenix pusilla - N
 Roystonea regia - I

Family: Pandanaceae - Screw palms
 Pandanus amaryllifolius - I
 Pandanus ceylanicus - Endemic 
 Pandanus kaida - N
 Pandanus odoratissimus - N
 Pandanus tectorius - I
 Pandanus thwaitesii - N

Division: Anthophyta

Subdivision: Magnoliids

Family: Acanthaceae - Acanthus
 Acanthus ilicifolius - N
 Avicennia marina - N
 Avicennia officinalis - N
 Barleria mysorensis - N
 Barleria prionitis - N
 Ecbolium viride - N
 Justicia adhatoda - N
 Pseuderanthemum carruthersii - N
 Pseuderanthemum maculatum - I
 Rhinacanthus nasutus - N
 Stenosiphonium cordifolium - N
 Strobilanthes anceps - Endemic
 Strobilanthes asperrima - Endemic
 Strobilanthes calycina - Endemic
 Strobilanthes helicoides - Endemic
 Strobilanthes hookeri - Endemic
 Strobilanthes sexennis - Endemic
 Strobilanthes trifida - Endemic
 Strobilanthes vestita - Endemic
 Strobilanthes viscosa - Endemic
 Strobilanthes walkeri - Endemic

Family: Annonaceae - Custard apples
 Alphonsea hortensis - Endemic
 Alphonsea sclerocarpa - N
 Alphonsea zeylanica - Endemic
 Annona cherimola  - I
 Annona glabra  - I
 Annona muricata  - I
 Annona reticulata  - I
 Annona squamosa  - I
 Cananga odorata  - I
 Cyathocalyx zeylanicus  - N
 Desmos zeylanicus  - N
 Goniothalamus gardneri  - Endemic
 Goniothalamus hookeri  - Endemic
 Goniothalamus thwaitesii  - N
 Miliusa indica  - N
 Polyalthia cerasoides  - N
 Polyalthia coffeoides  - N
 Polyalthia korinti  - N
 Polyalthia longifolia  - N
 Xylopia championii  - Endemic
 Xylopia nigricans  - Endemic

Family: Magnoliaceae - Magnolias
 Magnolia champaca  - I
 Magnolia nilagirica  - N

Family: Monimiaceae 
 Hortonia angustifolia  - Endemic
 Hortonia floribunda  - Endemic

Family: Myristicaceae - Nutmegs
 Horsfieldia irya  - N
 Horsfieldia iryaghedhi  - Endemic
 Myristica dactyloides  - Endemic
 Myristica fragrans  - I

Division: Anthophyta

Subdivision: Dicotyledons

Family: Anacardiaceae - Cashews 
 Anacardium occidentale - I
 Campnosperma zeylanicum - Endemic
 Lannea coromandelica - N
 Mangifera indica - I
 Mangifera zeylanica - Endemic
 Nothopegia beddomei - N
 Semecarpus coriacea - Endemic
 Semecarpus gardneri - Endemic
 Semecarpus nigro-viridis - Endemic
 Semecarpus subpeltata - Endemic
 Semecarpus walkeri - Endemic
 Spondias dulcis - I

Family: Anisophylleaceae 
 Anisophyllea cinnamomoides - Endemic

Family: Apocynaceae - Dogbanes 
 Allamanda cathartica - I
 Alstonia macrophylla - I
 Alstonia scholaris - N
 Calotropis gigantea - N
 Carissa carandas - N
 Carissa grandiflora - I
 Carissa spinarum - N
 Cerbera odollam - N
 Nerium oleander - I
 Plumeria obtusa - I
 Plumeria rubra - I
 Rauvolfia serpentina - N
 Rauvolfia verticillata - N (Syn. Rauvolfia densiflora)
 Tabernaemontana amygdalifolia - N (Syn. Pagiantha dichotoma)
 Tabernaemontana divaricata - I
 Thevetia peruviana - I
 Wrightia angustifolia - Endemic
 Wrightia antidysenterica - Endemic (Syn. Walidda antidysenterica)
 Wrightia flavorosea - Probably extinct

Family: Aquifoliaceae - Hollys 
 Ilex walkeri - N

Family: Araliaceae 
 Schefflera racemosa - N
 Schefflera stellata - N

Family: Aristolochiaceae - Birthworts 
 Thottea siliquosa - N

Family: Asteraceae - Composites 
 Tithonia diversifolia - I
 Vernonia arborea - N

Family: Bignoniaceae - Bignonias 
 Crescentia cujete - I
 Dolichandrone spathacea - N
 Jacaranda mimosifolia - I
 Oroxylum indicum - N
 Spathodea campanulata - I
 Stereospermum colais - N
 Tabebuia rosea - I
 Tabebuia serratifolia - I
 Tecoma stans - I

Family: Bixaceae - Achiotes 
 Bixa orellana - N
 Cochlospermum religiosum - I

Family: Boraginaceae - Forget-me-nots 
 Carmona retusa - N
 Cordia curassavica - I
 Cordia dichotoma - N
 Cordia monoica - N
 Cordia sinensis - N
 Cordia subcordata - N
 Ehretia laevis - N
 Tournefortia argentea - N

Family: Boraginaceae 
 Canarium zeylanicum - Endemic
 Commiphora caudata - N

Family: Buxaceae 
 Sarcococca zeylanica - Endemic

Family: Calophyllaceae - Chestnuts 
 Calophyllum bracteatum - Endemic
 Calophyllum calaba - Endemic
 Calophyllum inophyllum - N
 Calophyllum thwaitesii - Endemic
 Calophyllum walkeri - Endemic
 Mesua ferrea - Endemic
 Mesua thwaitesii - Endemic

Family: Cannabaceae 
 Celtis cinnamomea - N
 Celtis philippensis - N
 Gironniera parvifolia - Endemic
 Trema orientalis - N

Family: Capparaceae - Capers 
 Capparis zeylanica - N
 Crateva religiosa - N

Family: Caricaceae - Papayas 
 Carica papaya - I

Family: Casuarinaceae - Sheoaks 
 Casuarina equisetifolia - I

Family: Celastraceae - Bittersweets 
 Glyptopetalum zeylanicum - N
 Kokoona zeylanica - Endemic
 Microtropis wallichiana - N
 Microtropis zeylanica - Endemic

Family: Centroplacaceae 
 Bhesa ceylanica - Endemic
 Cassine glauca - Endemic
 Euonymus walkeri - Endemic
 Pleurostylia opposite - N

Family: Chloranthaceae 
 Sarcandra glabra - N

Family: Clusiaceae 
 Clusia rosea - I
 Garcinia echinocarpa - N
 Garcinia hermonii - Endemic
 Garcinia mangostana - I
 Garcinia morella - N
 Garcinia quaesita - Endemic
 Garcinia spicata - N
 Garcinia terpnophylla - Endemic

Family: Combretaceae - White mangroves 
 Anogeissus latifolia - N
 Lumnitzera racemosa - N
 Terminalia arjuna - N
 Terminalia bellirica - N
 Terminalia catappa - I
 Terminalia chebula - N

Family: Connaraceae 
 Connarus monocarpus - N

Family: Cornaceae 
 Mastixia arborea - N
 Mastixia tetrandra - Endemic

Family: Crypteroniaceae 
 Axinandra zeylanica - Endemic

Family: Daphniphyllaceae 
 Daphniphyllum neilgherrense - N

Family: Dichapetalaceae 
 Dichapetalum gelonioides - N

Family: Dilleniaceae 
 Dillenia indica - N
 Dillenia retusa - Endemic
 Dillenia suffruticosa - I
 Dillenia triquetra - Endemic
 Schumacheria alnifolia - Endemic
 Schumacheria castanaefolia - Endemic

Family: Dipterocarpaceae - Dipterocarps 
 Dipterocarpus hispidus - Endemic
 Dipterocarpus zeylanicus - Endemic
 Hopea jucunda - Endemic
 Shorea affinis - Endemic
 Shorea congestiflora - Endemic
 Shorea cordifolia - Endemic
 Shorea disticha - Endemic
 Shorea dyeri - Endemic
 Shorea gardneri - Endemic
 Shorea megistophylla - Endemic
 Shorea oblongifolia - Endemic
 Shorea stipularis - Endemic
 Shorea trapezifolia - Endemic
 Shorea worthingtonii - Endemic
 Shorea zeylanica - Endemic
 Stemonoporus acuminatus - Endemic
 Stemonoporus canaliculatus - Endemic
 Stemonoporus gardneri - Endemic
 Vateria copallifera - Endemic
 Vatica obscura - Endemic

Family: Ebenaceae - Ebonys 
 Diospyros acuminata - Endemic
 Diospyros ebenum - N
 Diospyros ferrea - N
 Diospyros hirsuta - Endemic
 Diospyros insignis - N
 Diospyros malabarica - N
 Diospyros melanoxylon - N
 Diospyros montana - N
 Diospyros oocarpa - N
 Diospyros ovalifolia - N
 Diospyros racemosa - N
 Diospyros thwaitesii - Endemic
 Diospyros walkeri - Endemic

Family: Elaeocarpaceae 
 Elaeocarpus amoenus - Endemic
 Elaeocarpus ceylanicus - Endemic
 Elaeocarpus glandulifer - Endemic
 Elaeocarpus hedyosmus - Endemic
 Elaeocarpus montanus - Endemic
 Elaeocarpus serratus - N
 Elaeocarpus subvillosus - N
 Elaeocarpus taprobanicus - Endemic

Family: Ericaceae - Heathers 
 Gaultheria leschenaultii - N
 Rhododendron arboreum - N

Family: Erythroxylaceae 
 Erythroxylum monogynum - N
 Erythroxylum zeylanicum - Endemic

Family: Euphorbiaceae - Spurges 
 Acalypha hispida - I
 Acalypha wilkesiana - I
 Agrostistachys borneensis - Endemic
 Agrostistachys hookeri - Endemic
 Aleurites moluccanus - I
 Blachia umbellata - N
 Chaetocarpus castanocarpus - N
 Chaetocarpus coriaceus - Endemic
 Chaetocarpus ferrugineus - Endemic
 Codiaeum variegatum - I
 Croton aromaticus - I
 Croton tiglium - N
 Dimorphocalyx glabellus - Endemic
 Euphorbia antiquorum - N
 Euphorbia pulcherrima - I
 Euphorbia tirucalli - I
 Excoecaria agallocha - N
 Excoecaria oppositifolia - N
 Hevea brasiliensis - I
 Homonoia riparia - N
 Jatropha curcas - I
 Macaranga indica - N
 Macaranga peltata - N
 Mallotus distans - N
 Mallotus eriocarpus - Endemic
 Mallotus fuscescens - Endemic
 Mallotus philippensis - N
 Mallotus resinosus - N
 Mallotus rhamnifolius - N
 Mallotus tetracoccus - N
 Mallotus thunbergianus - Endemic
 Manihot esculenta - I
 Manihot carthaginensis subsp. glaziovii - I
 Mischodon zeylanicus - N
 Paracroton pendulus - N
 Paracroton zeylanicus - N
 Podadenia sapida - Endemic
 Ricinus communis - I
 Suregada lanceolata - N

Family: Fabaceae - Legumes 
 Abrus precatorius - N
 Acacia decurrens - I
 Acacia mangium - I
 Acacia melanoxylon - I
 Acacia planifrons - N
 Adenanthera pavonina - I
 Albizia lebbeck - I
 Albizia odoratissima - N
 Albizia saman - I
 Archidendron bigeminum - N
 Archidendron clypearia subsp. subcoriaceum - N
 Bauhinia tomentosa - N
 Butea monosperma - N
 Calliandra guildingii - I
 Caesalpinia pulcherrima - I
 Cassia fistula - N
 Cassia javanica - I
 Cassia roxburghii - N
 Crudia zeylanica - E
 Delonix regia - I
 Dendrolobium triangulare - N (syn. Desmodium umbellatum Moritz.)
 Dialium ovoideum - Endemic
 Dichrostachys cinerea - N
 Erythrina fusca - N
 Erythrina variegata - N
 Falcataria moluccana - I (syn. Albizia falcataria)
 Flemingia macrophylla - N
 Flemingia strobilifera - N
 Gliricidia sepium - I
 Humboldtia laurifolia - N
 Leucaena leucocephala - I
 Millettia pinnata - N
 Parkinsonia aculeata - I
 Peltophorum pterocarpum - N
 Pericopsis mooniana - N
 Phanera variegata - I
 Bauhinia racemosa - N (syn. Piliostigma racemosum)
 Pithecellobium dulce - I
 Pterocarpus indicus - I
 Pterocarpus marsupium - N
 Saraca asoca - N
 Senna auriculata - N
 Senna siamea - N
 Senna spectabilis - N
 Sesbania grandiflora - I
 Sophora tomentosa - I
 Tadehagi triquetrum - I
 Tamarindus indica - I
 Vachellia leucophloea - I

Family: Gentianaceae 
 Fagraea ceilanica - N

Family: Goodeniaceae 
 Scaevola taccada - N

Family: Hernandiaceae 
 Gyrocarpus americanus - N

Family: Icacinaceae 
 Apodytes dimidiata - N

Family: Lamiaceae - Sages 
 Callicarpa tomentosa - N
 Volkameria inermis - N (syn. Clerodendrum inerme)
 Clerodendrum infortunatum - N
 Clerodendrum paniculatum - N
 Rotheca serrata - N (syn. Clerodendrum serratum)
 Gmelina arborea - I
 Tectona grandis - I
 Vitex altissima - N
 Vitex leucoxylon - N
 Vitex negundo - N
 Vitex trifolia - N

Family: Lauraceae - Laurels 
 Actinodaphne albifrons - Endemic
 Actinodaphne molochina - Endemic
 Actinodaphne quinqueflora - N (syn. Litsea quinqueflora)
 Actinodaphne speciosa - Endemic
 Actinodaphne stenophylla - Endemic
 Alseodaphne semecarpifolia - N
 Beilschmiedia zeylanica - Endemic
 Cinnamomum dubium - Endemic
 Cinnamomum ovalifolium - Endemic
 Cinnamomum verum - N
 Cryptocarya wightiana - N
 Litsea gardneri - Endemic
 Litsea glaberrima - Endemic
 Litsea glutinosa - N
 Litsea iteodaphne - Endemic
 Litsea longifolia - Endemic
 Litsea ovalifolia - Endemic
 Neolitsea cassia - Endemic
 Neolitsea fuscata - Endemic
 Persea americana - I
 Persea macrantha - N

Family: Lecythidaceae 
 Barringtonia acutangula - N
 Barringtonia asiatica - N
 Barringtonia racemosa - N
 Careya arborea - N
 Couroupita guianensis - I

Family: Loganiaceae 
 Strychnos nux-vomica - N

Family: Lythraceae 
 Lagerstroemia speciosa - N
 Punica granatum - I
 Sonneratia caseolaris - I

Family: Malvaceae - Mallows 
 Adansonia digitata - I
 Berrya cordifolia - N
 Bombax ceiba -  N
 Ceiba pentandra - I
 Diplodiscus verrucosus - Endemic
 Durio ceylanicus - Endemic (syn. Cullenia ceylanica)
 Durio rosayroanus - Endemic (syn. Cullenia rosayroana)
 Durio zibethinus - I
 Sterculia colorata - N (syn. Firmiana colorata)
 Grewia damine - N
 Grewia orientalis - N
 Grewia rothii - N
 Helicteres isora - N
 Heritiera littoralis - N
 Hibiscus platanifolius - N (syn. Hibiscus eriocarpus)
 Hibiscus rosa-sinensis - I
 Hibiscus tilliaceus - N
 Microcos paniculata - N
 Pterospermum suberifolium - N
 Sterculia balanghas - N
 Sterculia foetida - N
 Thespesia populnea - I
 Theobroma cacao - I

Family: Melastomataceae 
 Lijndenia capitellata - Endemic
 Melastoma malabathricum - N
 Memecylon angustifolium - N
 Memecylon parvifolium - Endemic
 Memecylon rostratum - Endemic
 Memecylon sphaerocarpum - Endemic
 Memecylon sylvaticum - Endemic
 Memecylon umbellatum - N
 Memecylon varians - Endemic
 Osbeckia aspera - N
 Osbeckia lanata - Endemic
 Osbeckia octandra - Possibly Endemic

Family: Meliaceae - Mahoganys 
 Aglaia apiocarpa - N
 Aglaia elaeagnoidea - N
 Aphanamixis polystachya - N
 Azadirachta indica - N
 Chukrasia tabularis - N
 Cipadessa baccifera - N
 Dysoxylum gotadhora - N (syn. Dysoxylum ficiforme)
 Dysoxylum championii - N
 Melia azedarach - N
 Swietenia macrophylla - I
 Swietenia mahagoni - I
 Toona ciliata - I
 Toona sinensis - I
 Heynea trifolia - N (syn. Walsura trifoliolata)

Family: Moraceae - Figs 
 Artocarpus altilis - I
 Artocarpus heterophyllus - I
 Artocarpus nobilis - Endemic
 Castilla elastica - I
 Ficus benghalensis - I
 Ficus benjamina - I
 Ficus elastica - I
 Ficus exasperata - N
 Ficus fergusonii - Endemic
 Ficus hispida - N
 Ficus microcarpa - N
 Ficus nervosa - N
 Ficus racemosa - N
 Ficus religiosa - I
 Ficus tinctoria - N
 Ficus tsjahela - N
 Ficus virens - N
 Morus alba - I
 Streblus asper - N

Family: Moringaceae - Drumsticks 
 Moringa oleifera - I

Family: Muntingiaceae 
 Muntingia calabura - I

Family: Myrtaceae - Myrtles 
 Eucalyptus camaldulensis - I
 Eucalyptus globulus - I
 Eucalyptus grandis - I
 Eucalyptus microcorys - I
 Eucalyptus pilularis - I
 Eucalyptus robusta - I
 Eugenia mabaeoides - Endemic
 Eugenia mooniana - N (syn. Eugenia thwaitesii)
 Eugenia roxburghii - N (syn. Eugenia bracteata)
 Psidium guajava - I
 Psidium guineense - I
 Psidium littorale - I
 Rhodomyrtus tomentosa - N
 Syzygium aqueum - N
 Syzygium aromaticum - I
 Syzygium assimile - N
 Syzygium caryophyllatum - N
 Syzygium cordifolium - Endemic
 Syzygium cumini - N
 Syzygium gardneri - N
 Syzygium jambos - I
 Syzygium makul - Endemic
 Syzygium malaccensis - I
 Syzygium micranthum - Endemic
 Syzygium neesianum - Endemic
 Syzygium oliganthum - Endemic
 Syzygium operculatum - Endemic
 Syzygium revolutum - N
 Syzygium rotundifolium - Endemic
 Syzygium rubicundum - N
 Syzygium spathulatum - Endemic
 Syzygium umbrosum - Endemic
 Syzygium zeylanicum - N

Family: Nyctaginaceae - Four o'clocks 
 Bougainvillea spectabilis - I
 Pisonia grandis - I

Family: Ochnaceae 
 Gomphia serrata - N
 Ochna lanceolata - N

Family: Olacaceae 
 Olax zeylanica - Endemic
 Strombosia nana - Endemic

Family: Oleaceae - Olives 
 Chionanthus albidiflorus - Endemic
 Chionanthus zeylanicus - N
 Jasminum angustifloium - N
 Jasminum auriculatum - N
 Jasminum rottlerianum - N
 Ligustrum robustum - N
 Nyctanthes arbor-tritis - I
 Olea polygama - N

Family: Pentaphylacaceae 
 Adinandra lasiopetala - Endemic
 Eurya acuminata - N
 Eurya nitida - N
 Ternstroemia gymnanthera - N

Family: Phyllanthaceae 
 Actephila excelsa - Endemic
 Antidesma alexiteria - N
 Antidesma jayasuriyae - Endemic
 Antidesma pyrifolium - Endemic
 Antidesma puncticulatum - N
 Aporosa cardiosperma - Endemic
 Aporosa fusiformis - Endemic
 Aporosa lanceolata - Endemic
 Aporosa latifolia - Endemic
 Breynia retusa - N
 Breynia vitis-idaea - N
 Bridelia moonii - Endemic
 Bridelia retusa - N
 Flueggea leucopyrus - N
 Glochidion gardneri - Endemic
 Glochidion moonii - Endemic
 Glochidion stellatum - Endemic
 Glochidion zeylanicum - N
 Phyllanthus acidus - I
 Phyllanthus emblica - N
 Phyllanthus indicus - N
 Phyllanthus myrtifolius - Endemic
 Phyllanthus polyphyllus - N
 Phyllanthus reticulatus - N
 Sauropus androgynus - N

Family: Pittosporaceae 
 Pittosporum ceylanicum - Endemic
 Pittosporum ferrugineum - I
 Pittosporum tetraspermum - N

Family: Primulaceae - Primroses 
 Ardisia gardneri - Endemic
 Ardisia paniculata - N
 Ardisia pauciflora - N
 Ardisia willisii - Endemic
 Maesa perrottetiana - N
 Myrsine robusta - N

Family: Proteaceae 
 Grevillea robusta - I

Family: Putranjivaceae 
 Drypetes sepiaria - N

Family: Rhamnaceae - Buckthorns 
 Colubrina asiatica - N
 Rhamnus wightii - N
 Scutia myrtina - N
 Zizyphus jujuba - N
 Zizyphus oenoplia - N
 Zizyphus rugosa - N

Family: Rhizophoraceae - True mangroves 
 Bruguiera cylindrica - N
 Bruguiera sexangula - N
 Carallia brachiata - N
 Ceriops tagal - N
 Rhizophora apiculata - N
 Rhizophora mucronata - N

Family: Rosaceae - Roses & Berries 
 Benkara malabarica - N
 Canthium coromandelicum - N
 Canthium dicoccum - Endemic
 Canthium montanum - Endemic
 Canthium rheedei - N
 Catunaregum spinosa - Endemic
 Chassalia ambigua - N
 Coffea arabica - N
 Dichilanthe zeylanica - Endemic
 Gaertnera vaginans - Endemic
 Gaertnera walkeri - Endemic
 Guettarda speciosa - N
 Haldina cordifolia - I
 Hedyotis fruticosa - N
 Hedyotis lawsoniae - Endemic
 Hedyotis lessertiana - Endemic
 Ixora arborea - N
 Ixora calycina - Endemic
 Ixora coccinea - N
 Ixora jucunda - Endemic
 Ixora macrothyrsa - I
 Ixora thwaitesii - N
 Lasianthus oliganthus - Endemic
 Lasianthus strigosus - Endemic
 Lasianthus varians - Endemic
 Lasianthus walkerianus - Endemic
 Metabolos decipiens - Endemic
 Mitragyna parvifolia - N
 Morinda citrifolia - N
 Morinda tinctoria - N
 Mussaenda frondosa - N
 Nargedia macrocarpa - Endemic
 Nauclea orientalis - N
 Pavetta gleniei - Endemic
 Pavetta indica - N
 Photinia intergrifolia - N
 Prunus cerasoides - I
 Prunus ceylanica - N
 Prunus walkeri - Endemic
 Psychotria nigra - N
 Psychotria sordida - Endemic
 Psychotria zeylanica - N
 Pyrus communis - I
 Randia gardneri - Endemic
 Saprosma foetens - N
 Tarenna asiatica - N
 Timonius jambosella - Endemic
 Tricalysia dalzellii - Endemic
 Tricalysia erythrospora - Endemic
 Urophyllum ellipticum - Endemic
 Urophyllum zeylanicum - N
 Wendlandia bicuspidata - N

Family: Rutaceae - Citrus 
 Acronychia pedunculata - N
 Aegle marmelos - N
 Atlanta ceylanica - N
 Atlanta monophylla - N
 Chloroxylon swietenia - N
 Citrus aurantiifolia - I
 Citrus grandis - I
 Citrus hystrix - I
 Citrus limon - I
 Citrus medica - I
 Citrus reticulata - I
 Clausena indica - N
 Euodia lunuankenda - I
 Glycosmis mauritiana - N
 Glycosmis pentaphylla - N
 Limonia acidissima - N
 Micromelum minutum - Endemic
 Murraya koenigii - N
 Murraya paniculata - N
 Pamburus missionis - N
 Pleiospermium alatum - N

Family: Sabiaceae 
 Meliosma pinnata - N
 Meliosma simplicifolia - N

Family: Salicaceae - Willows 
 Flacourtia indica - N
 Flacourtia inermis - I
 Homalium zeylanicum - N
 Hydnocarpus octandra - Endemic
 Hydnocarpus venenata - Endemic
 Scolopia acuminata - N
 Scolopia crassipes - Endemic
 Scolopia schreberi - Endemic

Family: Salvadoraceae - Toothbrushes 
 Azima tetracantha - N
 Salvadora persica - N

Family: Santalaceae - Sandalwoods 
 Santalum album - I

Family: Sapindaceae - Soapberries 
 Allophylus cobbe - N
 Allophylus zeylanicus - Endemic
 Dimocarpus longan - N
 Filicium decipiens - N
 Glenniea unijuga - Endemic
 Harpullia arborea - N
 Lepisanthes senegalensis - N
 Lepisanthes tetraphylla - N
 Nephelium lappaceum - I
 Pometia pinnata - N
 Sapindus emarginatus - N
 Schleichera oleosa - N

Family: Sapotaceae 
 Chrysophyllum cainito - N
 Isonandra alloneura - Endemic
 Isonandra compta - Endemic
 Isonandra lanceolata - N
 Isonandra zeylanica - Endemic
 Madhuca fulva - Endemic
 Madhuca longifolia - N
 Madhuca microphylla - Endemic
 Madhuca neriifolia - N
 Manilkara hexandra - N
 Mimusops elengi - N
 Palaquium canaliculatum - Endemic
 Palaquium grande - Endemic
 Palaquium laevifolium - Endemic
 Palaquium petiolare - Endemic
 Palaquium rubiginosum - Endemic
 Palaquium thawitesii - Endemic
 Pouteria campechiana - I
 Xantolis tomentosa - N

Family: Simaroubaceae 
 Quassia indica - N

Family: Solanaceae - Nightshades 
 Brugmansia suaveolens - I
 Brunfelsia americana - I
 Solanum erianthum - N
 Solanum giganteum - N
 Solanum tuberosum - I

Family: Staphyleaceae 
 Turpinia malabarica - I

Family: Stemonuraceae 
 Gomphandra coriacea - Endemic
 Gomphandra tetrandra - N
 Stemonurus apicalis - N

Family: Symplocaceae - Sweetleafs 
 Symplocos cochinchinensis - N
 Symplocos cordifolia - Endemic
 Symplocos coronata - Endemic
 Symplocos cuneata - Endemic
 Symplocos elegans - Endemic
 Symplocos macrophylla - N
 Symplocos obtusa - N
 Symplocos pulchra - Endemic

Family: Tetramelaceae 
 Tetrameles nudiflora - N

Family: Theaceae - Tea plants 
 Camellia sinensis - I
 Gordonia ceylanica - Endemic
 Gordonia speciosa - Endemic

Family: Thymelaeaceae 
 Gnidia glauca - N
 Gyrinops walla - N

Family: Ulmaceae 
 Holoptelea integrifolia - N

Family: Urticaceae - Nettles 
 Boehmeria nivea - I
 Boehmeria platyphylla - I
 Debregeasia longifolia - N
 Villebrunea intergrifolia - N

Family: Verbenaceae- Verbenas 
 Duranta erecta - I
 Lantana camara - I
 Premna mollissima - N (syn. Premna latifolia)
 Premna serratifolia - N
 Premna thwaitesii - Endemic
 Premna tomentosa - N
 Premna wightiana  - N

Recommended New Plant species
The presence of following bamboo plants within Sri Lanka is still in doubt.

Family Poaceae
 Bambusa balcooa
 Bambusa blumeana
 Bambusa nutans
 Bambusa textilis
 Bambusa tuldoides
 Cephalostachya pergracile
 Dendrocalamus brandisii
 Dendrocalamus membranaceus
 Dendrocalamus sikkimensis
 Gigantochloa apus
 Gigantochloa levis
 Giagntochloa macrostachya
 Giagntochloa verticillata
 Guadua angustifolia
 Oxytenanthera abyssinica
 Oxytenanthera nigrociliata
 Phyllostachys bambusoides
 Schizostachyum lima
 Teinostachyum dullooa
 Thyrsostachys oliverii

References

 http://dl.nsf.ac.lk/bitstream/handle/1/5462/NA-242.pdf?sequence=1

External links
 http://www.srilankaview.com/floraSL.htm
 https://web.archive.org/web/20120508002034/http://www.botanicgardens.gov.lk/herbarium/index.php?option=com_sobi2&Itemid=90
 https://web.archive.org/web/20141222083337/http://www.lankayoursnmine.com/NTGL/PDF/Exam%20Paper%20III/Flora%20of%20Sri%20lanka/Dr.%20Sudheera%20Ranwala%20-%20Flora%20in%20Sri%20Lanka.pdf
 http://dh-web.org/place.names/bot2sinhala.html
 http://www.cea.lk/web/images/pdf/redlist2012.pdf

 
Lists of trees
trees